Lazola Masingatha (born 26 February 1984) is a South African former cricketer. He played in thirteen first-class and twelve List A matches for Border from 2007 to 2009.

See also
 List of Border representative cricketers

References

External links
 

1984 births
Living people
South African cricketers
Border cricketers
Sportspeople from Qonce